Chak 138/10-R is a village in Khanewal District, Punjab Province Pakistan. The village has two main institutions. Govt Higher Secondary School (for boys) and Govt Girls High School. These two schools serve by educating the new generations not only from Chak 138/10-R but some neighboring villages.

References

Populated places in Khanewal District